Nicole Kim Donesa-Herras, (born May 27, 1994) is a Filipina actress, singer and beauty queen. She is best known for being crowned as Miss World Philippines 2014's Third Princess. She plays Martha, a scheming, arrogant, and villainous person in the television series Bihag.

Personal life
She graduated from Angelicum College, Quezon City with a degree in Bachelor of Arts in Communication. She grew up in the United States with her family and, having returned to the Philippines, decided to join the beauty pageant Binibining Pilipinas in 2013.

Filmography

References

External links
 

1994 births
Filipino television actresses
Living people